The Ven   John Woolhouse , Archdeacon of Tuam  died during 1662.

Notes

Irish Anglicans
Archdeacons of Tuam
1662 deaths